Emmily da Silva Pinheiro (born November 3, 1985 in Rio de Janeiro) is a Brazilian sprinter, who specialized in the 400 metres.

Biography
Pinheiro competed for the women's 4 × 400 m relay at the 2008 Summer Olympics in Beijing, along with her teammates Lucimar Teodoro, Maria Laura Almirão, and Josiane Tito. She ran on the third leg of the second heat, with an individual-split time of 51.95 seconds. Pinheiro and her team finished the relay in sixth place for a total time of 3:30.10, failing to advance into the final.

Achievements

References

External links

Profile – UOL Esporte 
NBC 2008 Olympics profile
Sports reference biography

Brazilian female sprinters
Living people
Olympic athletes of Brazil
Athletes (track and field) at the 2008 Summer Olympics
Athletes from Rio de Janeiro (city)
1985 births
Olympic female sprinters
21st-century Brazilian women